Bath Locks are a series of locks, now six locks, situated at the start of the Kennet and Avon Canal, at Bath, England.

Bath Bottom Lock, which is numbered as No 7 on the canal, is the meeting with the River Avon just south of Pulteney Bridge. Alongside the lock is a side pond and pumping station which pumps water up the locks to replace that used each time the lock is opened.

The next stage of Bath Deep Lock is numbered 8/9 as two locks were combined when the canal was restored in 1976. A road constructed while the canal was in a state of disrepair passes over the original site of the lower lock.

Just above the 'deep lock' is an area of water enabling the lock to refill and above this is Wash House Lock (number 10), and soon after by Abbey View Lock (number 11), a Grade II listed building by which there is another pumping station and in quick succession Pulteney Lock (12) and Bath top Lock (13).

Above the top lock the canal passes through Sydney Gardens where it passes through two tunnels and under two cast iron footbridges dating from 1800. The tunnel is a Grade II* listed building.

Many of the bridges over the canal are also listed buildings.

The locks were restored in 1968 by a collaboration involving staff from British Waterways and volunteer labour organised by the Kennet and Avon Canal Trust.

References

See also

Locks on the Kennet and Avon Canal

Locks
Grade II listed buildings in Bath and North East Somerset
Grade II* listed buildings in Bath, Somerset
Locks
Locks
Locks
Locks on the Kennet and Avon Canal
Grade II listed canals